John Laurent is a former member of the Florida State Senate. He graduated from Bartow High School. He served in the state senate from 1998 until 2008. He has also been a circuit judge.

References

Year of birth missing (living people)
Living people
Florida state senators